Kaiyuan Subdistrict is a subdistrict of Siming District, Xiamen, Fujian Province, People's Republic of China.

It is located in central Xiamen Island, north of the original Siming District and south of Huli District. It is named after a street meaning "Initiating the First (Year)".

History 
In October 1945, Kaiyuan was created as a district (Kaiyuan District 開元區) along with Zhongxin District Gulangyu District and Heshan District. In August 1966, it was renamed Dongfeng (lit. East Wind) District, but this was reverted in October 1979. Finally, in April 2003, Kaiyuan and Gulangyu Districts were merged into Siming District.

References
厦门市历史沿革 (Overview of History of Xiamen)

External links
 Official website

Geography of Xiamen
Township-level divisions of Fujian
Subdistricts of the People's Republic of China